Allied American University (AAU) was a private for-profit university in Laguna Hills, California. It was founded in 2008 and accredited by the Distance Education Accrediting Commission. The university offered bachelor's and associate degree programs in business administration, criminal justice, general studies, and allied health, altogether offering seven undergraduate degree programs and 10 certificate programs. It closed in 2016.

History 
Allied American University was the higher education division of Allied Business Schools, Inc. (also known as Allied Schools). Allied Schools provided distance education since 1992 and online learning since 1996. The university closed for business as of December 31, 2016, and is no longer servicing students.

From 2008 to 2016, AAU provided education programs for in-demand careers. The classroom student-to-teacher ratios were approximately 10:1.

Accreditation 
Allied American University was nationally accredited by the Distance Education Accrediting Commission (DEAC). It was also licensed to operate by the Bureau of Private Postsecondary Education (BPPE).

As of March 11, 2013, Allied American University was recognized as a Candidate for Accreditation by the Accrediting Commission for Senior Colleges and Universities of the Western Association of Schools and Colleges (WASC).

References 

Distance education institutions based in the United States
Former for-profit universities and colleges in the United States
2008 establishments in California
2016 disestablishments in California
Educational institutions established in 2008
Educational institutions disestablished in 2016